Tyoply Stan District  is an administrative district (raion) of South-Western Administrative Okrug, and one of the 125 raions of Moscow, Russia.

See also
Administrative divisions of Moscow

References

Districts of Moscow